Bathyraja is a large genus of skates in the family Arhynchobatidae.

Species
There are 55 recognized species in this genus:
 Bathyraja abyssicola (Gilbert, 1896) (Deep-sea skate)
 Bathyraja aguja (Kendall & Radcliffe, 1912) (Aguja skate)
 Bathyraja albomaculata (Norman, 1937) (White-dotted skate)
 Bathyraja aleutica (Gilbert, 1896) (Aleutian skate)
 Bathyraja andriashevi Dolganov, 1985 (Little-eyed skate)
 Bathyraja bergi Dolganov, 1983 (Bottom skate)
 Bathyraja brachyurops (Fowler, 1910) (Broadnose skate)
 Bathyraja cousseauae Díaz de Astarloa & Mabragaña, 2004 (Joined-fins skate)
 Bathyraja diplotaenia (Ishiyama, 1952) (Dusky-pink skate)
 Bathyraja eatonii (Günther, 1876) (Eaton's skate)
 Bathyraja fedorovi Dolganov, 1985 (Cinnamon skate)
 Bathyraja griseocauda (Norman, 1937) (Graytail skate)
 Bathyraja hesperafricana Stehmann, 1995 (West African skate)
 Bathyraja interrupta (Gill & Townsend, 1897) (Sandpaper skate)
 Bathyraja irrasa Hureau & Ozouf-Costaz, 1980 (Kerguelen sandpaper skate)
 Bathyraja ishiharai Stehmann, 2005 
 Bathyraja isotrachys (Günther, 1877) (Raspback skate)
 Bathyraja leucomelanos Iglésias & Lévy-Hartmann, 2012 (Domino Skate)
 Bathyraja lindbergi Ishiyama & Ishihara, 1977 (Commander skate)
 Bathyraja longicauda (F. de Buen, 1959) (Slimtail skate)
 Bathyraja maccaini Springer, 1971 (McCain's skate)
 Bathyraja macloviana (Norman, 1937) (Patagonian skate)
 Bathyraja maculata Ishiyama & Ishihara, 1977 (White-blotched skate)
 Bathyraja magellanica (Philippi {Krumweide}, 1902) (Magellan skate)
 Bathyraja mariposa Stevenson, Orr, Hoff & McEachran, 2004 (Butterfly skate)
 Bathyraja matsubarai (Ishiyama, 1952) (Dusky-purple skate)
 Bathyraja meridionalis Stehmann, 1987 (Dark-belly skate)
 Bathyraja minispinosa Ishiyama & Ishihara, 1977 (Smallthorn skate)
 Bathyraja multispinis (Norman, 1937) (Multispine skate)
 Bathyraja murrayi (Günther, 1880) (Murray's skate)
 Bathyraja notoroensis Ishiyama & Ishihara, 1977 (Notoro skate)
 Bathyraja pallida (Forster, 1967) (Pale ray)
 Bathyraja panthera Orr, Stevenson, Hoff, Spies & McEachran, 2011 (Leopard skate)
 Bathyraja papilionifera Stehmann, 1985 (Butterfly skate)
 Bathyraja parmifera (Bean, 1881) (Alaska skate)
 Bathyraja peruana McEachran & Miyake, 1984 (Peruvian skate)
 Bathyraja richardsoni (Garrick, 1961) (Richardson's ray)
 Bathyraja scaphiops (Norman, 1937) (Cuphead skate)
 Bathyraja schroederi (Krefft, 1968) (Whitemouth skate)
 Bathyraja sexoculata RYO MISAWA, ALEXEI M. ORLOV, SVETLANA Y. ORLOVA, ILYA I. GORDEEV, HAJIME ISHIHARA, TOMONORI HAMATSU, YUJI UEDA, KUNIHIRO FUJIWARA, HIROMITSU ENDO & YOSHIAKI KAI
 Bathyraja shuntovi Dolganov, 1985 (Longnose deep-sea skate)
 Bathyraja simoterus Ishiyama, 1967 (Hokkaido skate)
 Bathyraja smirnovi (Soldatov & Pavlenko, 1915) (Golden skate)
 Bathyraja smithii (Müller & Henle, 1841) (African softnose skate)
 Bathyraja spinicauda (Jensen, 1914) (Spinytail skate)
 Bathyraja spinosissima (Beebe & Tee-Van, 1941) (Spiny skate)
 Bathyraja trachouros (Ishiyama, 1958) (Eremo skate)
 Bathyraja taranetzi (Dolganov, 1983) (Mud skate)
 Bathyraja trachura (Gilbert, 1892) (Roughtail skate)
 Bathyraja tunae Stehmann, 2005
 Bathyraja tzinovskii Dolganov, 1985 (Creamback skate)
 Bathyraja violacea (Suvorov, 1935) (Okhotsk skate)

References

 
Rajidae
Ray genera